Something to Hide (in the U.S. also reissued as Shattered), is a 1972 British thriller film, written and directed by Alastair Reid, based on a 1963 novel by Nicholas Monsarrat.  The film stars Peter Finch, Shelley Winters, Colin Blakely, Linda Hayden and John Stride.  Finch plays a man harassed by his shrewish wife (Winters) who, after picking up a pregnant teenage hitchhiker (Hayden), is driven to murder and madness.  The film was not released commercially in the United States until 1976.

Cast
 Peter Finch as Harry Field 
 Shelley Winters as Gabriella 
 Colin Blakely as Blagdon 
 John Stride as Sergeant Tom Winnington 
 Linda Hayden as Lorelei 
 Harold Goldblatt as Dibbick 
 Rosemarie Dunham as Elsie 
 Helen Fraser as Miss Bunyan 
 Jack Shepherd as Joe Pepper 
 Graham Crowden as Lay Preacher

References

1972 films
Atlantic Entertainment Group films
British thriller films
1970s thriller films
Films directed by Alastair Reid
Films based on British novels
Films scored by Roy Budd
1970s English-language films
1970s British films